The occipitalis muscle (occipital belly) is a muscle which covers parts of the skull. Some sources consider the occipital muscle to be a distinct muscle. However, Terminologia Anatomica currently classifies it as part of the occipitofrontalis muscle along with the frontalis muscle.

The occipitalis muscle is thin and quadrilateral in form. It arises from tendinous fibers from the lateral two-thirds of the superior nuchal line of the occipital bone and from the mastoid process of the temporal and ends in the epicranial aponeurosis.

The occipitalis muscle is innervated by the facial nerve and its function is to move the scalp back. The muscles receives blood from the occipital artery.

Additional image

See also
 Occipitofrontalis muscle

References

External links
 PTCentral

Muscles of the head and neck